Acehnese or Achinese is an Austronesian language natively spoken by the Acehnese people in Aceh, Sumatra, Indonesia. This language is also spoken by Acehnese descendants in some parts of Malaysia like Yan, in Kedah.

Name 
As of 1988, Acehnese is the modern English name spelling and the bibliographical standard, and Acehnese people use the spelling Acehnese when writing in English. Achinese is an antiquated spelling of the English language tradition.  is the Dutch spelling and an outdated Indonesian one. The spelling Achehnese originates from a 1906 English translation of the Dutch-language  by Christiaan Snouck Hurgronje, 1892. In Acehnese the language is called . In Indonesian it is called .

Classification and related languages 
Acehnese belongs to the Malayo-Polynesian branch of Austronesian. Acehnese's closest relatives are the other Chamic languages, which are principally spoken in Vietnam and Cambodia. The closest relative of the Chamic family is the Malay language family, which includes languages also spoken in Sumatra such as Minangkabau as well as the national language, Indonesian.

Paul Sidwell notes that Acehnese likely has an Austroasiatic substratum.

Distribution 

Acehnese language is spoken primarily in coastal region of Aceh. This language is spoken in thirteen regencies and four cities in Aceh, which are:

City
 Sabang
 Banda Aceh
 Lhokseumawe
 Langsa

North-East Coast
 Aceh Besar
 Pidie
 Pidie Jaya
 Bireuen
 North Aceh
 East Aceh (except in three districts, Serba Jadi, Peunaron and Simpang Jernih, where the Gayo language is spoken)
 Aceh Tamiang (Mostly Manyak Payet and Kuala Simpang District; the rest of the Regency speaks a variety of the Malay language)

West-South Coast
 Aceh Jaya
 West Aceh
 Nagan Raya
 Southwest Aceh (except in Susoh District where the Aneuk Jamee language is spoken)
 South Aceh (mixed with Kluet language and Aneuk Jamee language)

Phonology 

Oral monophthong vowels in Acehnese are shown in the table below.

In addition to the modern 26 letter basic Latin alphabet, Acehnese uses the supplementary letters è, é, ë, ô, and ö, making a total of 31 letters in its orthography.

The table below shows the Acehnese consonant phonemes and the range of their realizations.

Notes:
Syllable-final orthographic  always represents  save in certain recent loans

Grammar
Acehnese features a split ergative system. Intransitives that align with the agent of a transitive verb (Sa) always show agreement by a proclitic (1). Meanwhile, intransitives that align with the patient of a transitive verb (Sp) may optionally show agreement by an enclitic (2). Volitionality is the determining factor for whether an intransitive verb is Sa or Sp.

Writing system 
Formerly, the Acehnese language was written in an Arabic script called Jawoë or Jawi in the Malay language. The script is less common nowadays. Since colonization by the Dutch, the Acehnese language has been written in the Latin script, with the addition of supplementary letters. The diacritical letters are é, è, ë, ö and ô. The letter 'ë' is used exclusively to represent the schwa sound which forms the second part of diphthongs. The letters f, q, v, x, and z are only used in loanwords.

Literature 
Acehnese language is rich with literature. The oldest manuscript written in Acehnese is Hikayat Seumau'un from 1658 CE. Most Acehnese literatures consist of poetic works, very little written in prose form.

Dialects 
At least ten Achehnese dialects exist: Pasè, Peusangan, Matang, Pidië, Buëng, Banda, Daya,  Meulabôh, Seunagan, and Tunong.

Vocabulary

Pronouns

Numerals

Interrogative words

Gallery

References

Bibliography

Further reading

External links 

 Learning Acehnese in Indonesian
 BasaAceh.org
 Learning Acehnese in English and Indonesian 
 Acehnese literature resources
 Acehnese at Omniglot
 
 
 PARADISEC archive of Ache language includes three collections; MD4, MD5, and MD6. These collections focus on different varieties of Achenese.
 Listen to a sample of Achinese from Global Recordings Network

 
Languages of Indonesia
Languages of Aceh
Chamic languages